The Roman Catholic Diocese of Guanare is a diocese located in the city of Guanare in the Ecclesiastical province of Barquisimeto in Venezuela.

History
On 7 June 1954 Pope Pius XII established as Diocese of Guanare from the Diocese of Barquisimeto and Diocese of Calabozo.

Special churches
Minor Basilicas:
Basílica Menor Santuario Nacional Nuestra Señora de Coromoto

Ordinaries
 Bishops of Guanare (Roman rite), in reverse chronological order
 Bishop José de la Trinidad Valera Angulo (2011.10.12 – present)
 Bishop José Sótero Valero Ruz (2001.03.19 – 2011.10.12)
 Bishop Alejandro Figueroa Medina (1995.02.21 – 2000.09.29)
 Bishop Angel Adolfo Polachini Rodriguez (1971.03.25 – 1994.04.16)
 Bishop Eduardo Herrera Riera (1966.11.30 – 1970.10.31), appointed Auxiliary Bishop of Barquisimeto
 Bishop Pedro Pablo Tenreiro Francia (1954.10.23 – 1965.11.11)

See also 
 Roman Catholicism in Venezuela

References

External links
 GCatholic.org
 Catholic Hierarchy 

Roman Catholic dioceses in Venezuela
Roman Catholic Ecclesiastical Province of Barquisimeto
Christian organizations established in 1954
Roman Catholic dioceses and prelatures established in the 20th century
1954 establishments in Venezuela
Guanare